Luca Toso (born 15 February 1964) is a former Italian high jumper. He won two medals at the International athletics competitions.

Biography
He finished tenth at the 1983 World Championships and the 1985 World Indoor Games, thirteenth at the 1988 Olympic Games and eighth at the 1990 European Championships. At the Mediterranean Games he won silver medals in 1987 and 1991. He also competed at the 1987 World Championships without reaching the final.

Because of these results, Luca Toso was almost always punctual at the major international events in which he participated, hitting the final on five out of six occasions (two world championships, two Europeans and one Olympics), failing to make an appointment only for the 1987 outdoor world championships. In addition to the silver medals at the Mediterranean Games, he also hit the final in two editions of the Universiade (1987 and 1989).

His personal best jump is 2.32 metres, achieved in July 1988 in Turin. This was the Italian record until September 1989, when Marcello Benvenuti broke it by one centimetre.

National records
 High jump: 2.30 m ( Padua, 13 June 1988)
 High jump: 2.32 m ( Turin, 21 July 1988)

Achievements

National titles
Luca Toso has won 3 times the individual national championship.
2 wins in high jump (1982, 1988)
1 win in high jump indoor (1992)

See also
 Men's high jump Italian record progression
 Italian all-time top lists - High jump

References

External links
 

1964 births
Living people
Italian male high jumpers
Athletes (track and field) at the 1988 Summer Olympics
Olympic athletes of Italy
Athletics competitors of Fiamme Oro
Mediterranean Games silver medalists for Italy
Athletes (track and field) at the 1987 Mediterranean Games
Athletes (track and field) at the 1991 Mediterranean Games
World Athletics Championships athletes for Italy
Mediterranean Games medalists in athletics
Sportspeople from Udine